Sevier School District is a school district headquartered in Richfield, Utah.

It covers all of Sevier County.

Services
In 1992 the Utah Schools for the Deaf and the Blind (USDB) began a partnership with the district in educating deaf students at Sevier schools.

Schools
 High schools
 Cedar Ridge High School
 North Sevier High School
 Richfield High School
 South Sevier High School
 Sevier CTE Center
 It was created as a career development center for all of the high schools in the school district.

 Middle schools
 North Sevier
 Red Hills
 South Sevier

 Elementary schools
 Ashman
 Koosharem
 Monroe
 Pahvant
 Salina

 Preschools
 Monroe
 Richfield
 Salina

References

External links
 Sevier School District
School districts in Utah
Education in Sevier County, Utah